Reinach Venter (born ) is a South African rugby union player for Clermont Auvergne in the Top 14. His regular position is hooker.

Rugby career

Venter was born in Pretoria.

References

South African rugby union players
Living people
1995 births
Rugby union players from Pretoria
Rugby union hookers
Cheetahs (rugby union) players
Free State Cheetahs players
ASM Clermont Auvergne players
Western Province (rugby union) players
Griffons (rugby union) players
SC Albi players